Bariloche is a department of Río Negro Province, Argentina.

Geography 
The department lies in the extreme west of the Rio Negro province.

Its borders adjoin:
 Neuquén Province to the north
  Pilcaniyeu and  Ñorquincó departments to the east
 Chubut Province to the south
 Chile on the west

The city of San Carlos de Bariloche functions as the administrative centre of the province.

References 

Departments of Río Negro Province